Eyewitness News (also referred to as EWN) is a South African multi-platform news publisher, focusing on local and international breaking news stories, entertainment, sport, business, politics and interactive media.

Notable coverage 
On 3 March 2014, EWN along with sister radio brands, 702 and CapeTalk launched a digital pop-up radio station covering the Oscar Pistorius Trial. The pop-up radio station concluded on the final day of sentencing on 21 October 2014.

References

External links

Radio stations in South Africa
News and talk radio stations
South African news websites
Online newspapers published in South Africa